Thomas Phillipps Lamb  (1752–1819) was an English politician.

Life
Lamb was the son of Thomas Lamb, many times mayor of Rye, Sussex, and his wife Dorothy Eyles, daughter of the Rev. George Eyles, vicar of Turk Dean. He was Member of Parliament (MP) for Rye from 1812 until his death.

Family
Lamb married in 1774 Elizabeth Davis, daughter of William Davis of Rye. They had three sons and two daughters. Of the sons, Thomas was a priest in the Church of England and held incumbencies at Windlesham, Bagshot, West Hackney and the City of London. Their daughter (Martha) Sabina married in 1829 Antonio Caccia (1801–1867) from Milan, a political exile.

References 

1752 births
People from Rye, East Sussex
1819 deaths
Members of the Parliament of the United Kingdom for English constituencies
UK MPs 1812–1818
UK MPs 1818–1820